Edward Leonard O'Neill (born April 12, 1946) is an American actor and comedian. His roles include Al Bundy on the Fox Network sitcom Married... with Children, for which he was nominated for two Golden Globes, and Jay Pritchett on the award-winning ABC sitcom Modern Family, for which he was nominated for three Primetime Emmy Awards and won four Screen Actors Guild Awards (all four for being part of the best Ensemble in a Comedy Series). He has also appeared in the Wayne's World film series, Little Giants, Prefontaine, The Bone Collector, and Sun Dogs, and has done voice-work for the Wreck-It Ralph franchise and Finding Dory.

Early life
O'Neill was born into an Irish-American Catholic family in Youngstown, Ohio on April 12, 1946. His mother, Ruth Ann (née Quinlan), was a homemaker and social worker, and his father, Edward Phillip O'Neill, was a steel mill worker and truck driver. O'Neill attended Ursuline High School where he played football. At 14 he worked in construction, then at a steel mill.

He was awarded a football scholarship to Ohio University, where he majored in history, and was a member of the Mu chapter of the Delta Tau Delta fraternity. He left the university after his sophomore year. He admits he spent more time playing sports and partying than studying. He also feuded with his coach.

He transferred to Youngstown State University, where he was a defensive lineman. As an undergraduate, he pledged Delta Sigma Phi and was initiated into the Delta Sigma chapter there.

Professional football career

Pittsburgh Steelers (1969) 
O'Neill was signed as an undrafted free agent by the Pittsburgh Steelers in 1969 under rookie head coach Chuck Noll but was cut in training camp, having to compete with fellow rookie defensive lineman "Mean Joe" Greene and L. C. Greenwood for a roster spot. Both became key members of the Steel Curtain defense during the Steelers success in the 1970s. Later, while on Married... with Children, O'Neill played a former high school football star who had failed to make it big and constantly reminisced about his "glory days" at Polk High ("I once scored four touchdowns in a single game"). As part of this theme, former Pittsburgh Steelers great and Pro Football Hall of Fame quarterback Terry Bradshaw also made two guest appearances on the show. O'Neill worked as a substitute social studies teacher at his alma mater Ursuline High School before becoming an actor.

Career

O'Neill re-enrolled at Youngstown State after being cut by the Steelers and was one of the first students at the school's new theater program. Later, in 1979, he played a boxer opposite Danny Aiello in the Broadway play Knockout. It was there that he was seen by director William Friedkin and landed his first movie role, as a police detective in Cruising, starring Al Pacino.

In 1985, O'Neill appeared alongside Jeff Kinsland in a Red Lobster commercial. He made a brief guest appearance in The Equalizer. In 1986, he was cast as NYPD detective Jimmy "Popeye" Doyle for the planned television series Popeye Doyle. The character had originally appeared in the motion picture The French Connection (played by Gene Hackman). The two-hour made-for-television movie/pilot was filmed and shown on network television. O'Neill received good reviews for his performance, and the pilot received positive ratings, but the series was not picked up for production.

In 1986, while playing the role of Lennie in a stage production of John Steinbeck's Of Mice and Men at the Hartford Theater in Hartford, Connecticut, he was seen by a casting agent from the Fox television network and was asked to audition for the role of Al Bundy in Married... with Children, a proposed sitcom about a dysfunctional family living in Chicago. He won the part because, during the audition, he simply slumped his shoulders and sighed as he was about to walk through the front door of the home. Married... with Children led off the first night of Fox's primetime lineup on April 5, 1987, concluding after 11 seasons on June 9, 1997.

During and following the success of Married... with Children, O'Neill starred in several films, including Dutch and Little Giants. He also had small parts in The Bone Collector, Wayne's World, and Wayne's World 2, and appeared as Relish the Troll King in The 10th Kingdom. O'Neill made a brief appearance on the comedy variety show In Living Color, playing the "Dirty Dozens" champion who defeats the challenger, played by Jamie Foxx. He also made a cameo on the sitcom 8 Simple Rules as the ex-boyfriend of Cate S. Hennessy (played by Katey Sagal, who portrayed O'Neill's wife Peggy Bundy on Married... with Children). He appeared in the movie The Adventures of Ford Fairlane with Andrew Dice Clay. During the mid-1990s, he had a string of appearances in commercials for 1-800-COLLECT.

Law & Order franchise creator Dick Wolf cast O'Neill as Sgt. Joe Friday in his 2003 remake of Jack Webb's classic TV crime series Dragnet. The series was canceled by ABC in its second season. O'Neill went on to appear as Governor Eric Baker, a recurring character on NBC's The West Wing. O'Neill also played Bill on HBO's television series John from Cincinnati.

In 2008, O'Neill appeared in an advertisement for then-presidential candidate Barack Obama as "Al the Shoesalesman".

In January 2009, O'Neill reunited with David Faustino (Bud Bundy from Married... with Children) for two episodes of Faustino's show Star-ving. O'Neill also appeared with the entire cast of Married... with Children again when they were honored at the 7th Annual TV Land Award show in 2009.

From 2009 to 2020, O'Neill played the role of Jay Pritchett on the ABC sitcom Modern Family, a role that earned him three Primetime Emmy Award nominations—in 2011, 2012, and 2013. Since 2012, O'Neill has done voice-overs in TV advertisements for the over-the-counter form of Zyrtec, along with Walmart's store-branded mobile phone service Straight Talk.

In 2016, O'Neill starred as Hank the Octopus in the Pixar animated film Finding Dory. According to O'Neill, he didn't realize at first that he had a starring role in the film. As his voice recording sessions continued and most of his interactions turned out to be with Dory, he began to suspect that Hank was a major character in the film.

Personal life
O'Neill is married to actress Catherine Rusoff. As of 2016, they were living in Los Angeles with their two daughters.

After being introduced to Brazilian jiu-jitsu by his friend writer/director John Milius, O'Neill has trained for 22 years under the mentoring of Rorion Gracie. In December 2007, O'Neill received his black belt. In the 2012 TV documentary I Am Bruce Lee, O'Neill states that he considers getting his black belt "the greatest achievement of my life, apart from my children."

Filmography

Film

Television

Bibliography

Awards and nominations

O'Neill received a star on the Hollywood Walk of Fame on August 30, 2011, ironically located in front of a shoe store.

See also
 List of Brazilian jiu-jitsu practitioners

References

External links
 
 

1946 births
Living people
20th-century American comedians
20th-century American male actors
21st-century American comedians
21st-century American male actors
American football defensive linemen
American male comedians
American male film actors
American male television actors
American male voice actors
American people of Irish descent
American practitioners of Brazilian jiu-jitsu
Male actors from Youngstown, Ohio
Ohio Bobcats football players
People awarded a black belt in Brazilian jiu-jitsu
Pittsburgh Steelers players
Players of American football from Youngstown, Ohio
Youngstown State Penguins football players